Warren Street station is a light rail station on the MBTA Green Line B branch, located on Commonwealth Avenue at Warren Street in Allston, Boston, Massachusetts. The station is not accessible. It has two side platforms, located on the near sides of the Warren Street grade crossing, to serve the line's two tracks.

History

Streetcar service began when the section from Packards Corner to Chestnut Hill Avenue opened on May 26, 1900, connecting previously opened trackage to the east and west. The trackage was not in a center median (as were the earlier sections), but in a reservation between the southbound travel lane and southbound carriage lane. Between Warren Street and Wallingford Road to the southwest, the reservation was significantly wider than the tracks. In 1960, new southbound travel lanes were built along that section; southbound traffic now crosses the B branch tracks at Warren Street.

Until 1983, the inbound platform had only a curb to separate passengers from the southbound travel lanes. While the line was shut down for track replacement from July 30 to September 10, 1983, the station was rebuilt with a low wall on the inbound platform to separate passengers from traffic, as well as a small shelter.

References

External links

MBTA - Warren Street
Station from Warren Street on Google Maps Street View

Brighton, Boston
Green Line (MBTA) stations
Railway stations in Boston
Railway stations in the United States opened in 1900